The Housing Act 1985 is a British Act of Parliament. The act introduced laws relating to the succession of Council Houses.
It also facilitated the transfer of council housing to not-for-profit housing associations.

OvercrowdingParagraph 236 Replicates the 1935 Housing Act, Part 10, including using space standards as a means by which to control overcrowding. A breach of these standards is a criminal offence.

A child under 10, is a 1/2 person.

See also
English land law
Housing Act 1980
Public housing in the United Kingdom § Stock transfer

References
Notes

Bibliography

United Kingdom Acts of Parliament 1985
Housing legislation in the United Kingdom